Monnechroma tibiale is a species of beetle in the family Cerambycidae. It was described by Giesbert in 1987. It is known from Costa Rica.

References

Callichromatini
Beetles described in 1987
Endemic fauna of Costa Rica